Anton Malatinský (15 January 1920 – 1 December 1992) was a Slovak football player and coach. He was a technically adept playmaking midfielder and, as a coach, he was regarded as a good strategist.

Malatinský won two Czechoslovak First League titles as a player and a further three as manager. In his coaching capacity he also led his teams to the Mitropa Cup and two Czechoslovak Cups.

Playing career
He played in 219 league matches and scored 79 goals, most of them for Spartak Trnava. Today, the club's home ground bears his name. Although his time playing for Trnava did not bring any championships, he won the league twice as a player with Sokol NV Bratislava.

Malatinský represented Czechoslovakia in 10 international matches and was included in his nation's squad at the 1954 World Cup but did not play in the tournament. He became only the second Spartak player in history to be selected for the Slovakia national team after František Bolček in 1939, as well as the second selected for Czechoslovakia after Jozef Marko one month earlier in 1948.

Coaching career
Malatinský achieved more fame as a coach than as a player. While still playing football at a high level, he began coaching youth sides. In 1948, he led Spartak's junior team to a national championship.

A knee injury in 1956 ended his playing career, after which he devoted himself exclusively to coaching. He was in charge of Spartak Trnava on three occasions, including two spells during their golden era, for a total of 14 years over two decades. With Trnava he won the 1966–67 Mitropa Cup, three league titles and two domestic cups. He also later coached their arch-rival, Slovan Bratislava, and several clubs in Austria and the Netherlands.

Honours

Player 

Sokol NV Bratislava

 Czechoslovak First League: 1950, 1951

Manager 

Spartak Trnava

 Czechoslovak First League: 1967–68, 1971–72, 1972–73
 Czechoslovak Cup: 1966–67, 1974–75
 Mitropa Cup: 1966–67

References

Sources 
 

1920 births
1992 deaths
Slovak footballers
FC Spartak Trnava players
Czechoslovak footballers
1954 FIFA World Cup players
Czechoslovakia international footballers
Slovak football managers
Czechoslovak football managers
ŠK Slovan Bratislava players
ADO Den Haag managers
ŠK Slovan Bratislava managers
FC Spartak Trnava managers
Dual internationalists (football)
Sportspeople from Trnava
Expatriate football managers in the Netherlands
Expatriate football managers in Austria
Czechoslovak expatriates in Austria
Czechoslovak expatriates in the Netherlands
Association football midfielders
Slovakia international footballers